Nauranga Bass Jattan is a village in the Bhiwani district of the Indian state of Haryana. In this village there is a famous temple of the Hindu which is very famous in nearby area people from other states also visit there 

Villages in Bhiwani district